Karl Laux (26 August 1896 in Ludwigshafen – 27 June 1978 in Dresden) was a German musicologist, music critic and rector.

Compositions 
 Musik und Musiker der Gegenwart, I. volume: Deutschland, 1958
 Die Musik in Russland und in der Sowjetunion
 Joseph Haas. Portrait eines Künstlers – Bild einer Zeit. Mainz, 1931.
 Nachklang, Rückschau auf sechs Jahrzehnte kulturellen Wirkens, Verlag der Nation Berlin, 1977.
 Numerous other publications of books and larger articles by the author are listed in the appendix of the book Nachklang.
 Die Sächsische Landesbibliothek – Staats- und Universitätsbibliothek Dresden, SLUB has a special catalogue for Nachlass put online by Prof. Dr. Karl Laux.

Further reading 
 Marion Demuth: Karl Laux: Autor, Kulturpolitiker, Rektor, in Dresden und die avancierte Musik im 20. Jahrhundert. Part II: 1933–1966, edited by Matthias Herrmann and Hanns-Werner Heister, Laaber 2002,  (Musik in Dresden 5), 
 
 Laux, Karl on Torsten Musical

References

External links 

 

1896 births
1978 deaths
People from Ludwigshafen
People from the Kingdom of Bavaria
Socialist Unity Party of Germany members
Cultural Association of the GDR members
Members of the 3rd Volkskammer
German music critics
German music journalists
20th-century German writers
Musik und Gesellschaft editors
Recipients of the Patriotic Order of Merit (honor clasp)
20th-century German musicologists